Hakkloa is a regulated lake in Nordmarka in Oslo, Norway. Hakkloa drains through the river Hakkloelva to the lake Bjørnsjøen, and further to Skjærsjøen and Maridalsvannet.

References

Lakes of Oslo